Guazzora is a comune (municipality) in the Province of Alessandria in the Italian region Piedmont, located about  east of Turin and about  northeast of Alessandria.

Guazzora borders the following municipalities: Alzano Scrivia, Castelnuovo Scrivia, Isola Sant'Antonio, Molino dei Torti, and Sale.

Demographic evolution

References

Cities and towns in Piedmont